Slouching Towards Liverpool is an EP that includes live performances of songs from The Loud Family's first album, Plants and Birds and Rocks and Things, as well as some live studio tracks recorded at WNUR-FM in Evanston, Illinois.

"Back of a Car" is a cover version of a song by Big Star, while "Erica's Word" is a cover version of a song by the Loud Family leader Scott Miller's earlier band, Game Theory. Michael Quercio, leader of The Three O'Clock and a member of Game Theory in 1989 and 1990, plays bass guitar on "The Come On".

The EP's title alludes to William Butler Yeats's poem The Second Coming, which ends with the lines "And what rough beast, its hour come round at last,
Slouches towards Bethlehem to be born?" The Loud Family's use is a nod to both Scott Miller's literary interests and to the hometown of The Beatles.

Track listing
"Take Me Down" – 3:09
"The Come On" – 3:23
"Back of a Car" – 2:27
"Slit My Wrists" (Live at WNUR-FM) – 2:52
"Aerodeliria" (Live at WNUR-FM) – 3:05
"Erica's Word" (Live in studio) – 4:04

Personnel
Jozef Becker - drums and percussion
Scott Miller - vocals and rhythm guitar
R. Dunbar Poor - bass guitar
Zachary Smith - lead guitar
Paul Wieneke - keyboards and backing vocals

References

1993 EPs
The Loud Family albums
1993 live albums
Albums produced by Mitch Easter
Live EPs
Jangle pop EPs